The  is a limited express train service operated in Japan by Central Japan Railway Company (JR Central), which runs between Toyohashi and Iida on the Iida line. It began operation as an express service in 1992, and as a limited express service in 1996. Like other JR Central limited express services, the service is branded Wide View Inaji.

History
The first Inaji service ran in March 1992 as an express service. It was upgraded in March 1996 to limited express status,. and in July of the same year, the service was rebranded as Wide View Inaji.

In 2007, all services became completely non-smoking. 

In September 2013, service was suspended due to Typhoon Man-yi. Service resumed on October 10 of the same year.

Stations stopped
Trains stop at the following stations:

Toyohashi - Toyokawa - Shinshiro - Hon-Nagashino - Yuya-Onsen - Chūbu-Tenryū - Misakubo - Hiraoka - Nukuta - Tenryūkyō - Iida

Service
Like all JR Central limited express trains, a limited express fee has to be paid, on top of the normal fee to ride this service. Services are formed of 3-car 373 series EMUs. There are 2 return workings a day, with the journey time taking approximately 2 hours and 40 minutes from Toyohashi to Iida. Trains operate at a maximum speed of 85 km/h (53 mph).
Both Toyohashi bound services are timetabled to connect with a Tokyo bound Hikari service on the Tōkaidō Shinkansen

Facilities
Only standard class is available on this service. Cars 2 and 3 are unreserved, while seats can be reserved in car 1 for an additional fee. There are no catering facilities available. There are toilets on this train.

References

This article incorporates information from the corresponding article in the Japanese Wikipedia.

Named passenger trains of Japan